USS Chaffinch may refer to one of the following United States Navy ships named after the common chaffinch:

 , was built in 1928 by Bethlehem Shipbuilding in Quincy, Massachusetts, as Trimont. She was purchased by the Navy on 29 November 1940 and commissioned 16 July 1941.
 , the former USS LSI(L)-694 converted to a coastal minesweeper in 1952

United States Navy ship names